Polietes is a genus from the fly family Muscidae.

Species List
P. domitor (Harris, 1780)
P. hirticrura Meade, 1887
P. hirticrus Meade, 1887
P. lardarius (Fabricius, 1781)
P. major (Ringdahl, 1926)
P. meridionalis Peris & Llorente, 1963
P. nigrolimbatus (Bonsdorff, 1866)
P. orichalceoides (Huckett, 1965)
P. steinii (Ringdahl, 1913)

References

Muscidae
Diptera of Europe
Brachycera genera
Taxa named by Camillo Rondani